Sergejus Jeriomkinas is a Lithuanian male acrobatics gymnast. He competed in pairs with Jana Plotnikova.

Jeriomkinas started acrobatics at the Visaginas Acrobatics Sports School.

In 1992 the pair won silver in the European championships, bronze in the world championships and qualified for the World Games. In the 1993 World Games, the Plotnikova/Jeriomkinas pair won silver in the mixed pairs tempo event.

References 

Year of birth missing (living people)
Living people
Lithuanian acrobatic gymnasts
Male acrobatic gymnasts
People from Visaginas
World Games silver medalists
Competitors at the 1993 World Games
Medalists at the Acrobatic Gymnastics World Championships